Fred Zamberletti (May 28, 1932 – September 2, 2018) was an athletic trainer in American football.

Born in Melcher, Iowa, he was the athletic trainer for the Minnesota Vikings of the National Football League. He was the team's first athletic trainer, assuming the job in the Vikings inaugural year of 1961. He was on the sidelines for every preseason, regular season and postseason game in Vikings history until the December 24, 2011 game at Washington against the Redskins. He attended the University of Iowa. Zamberletti was named the Professional Athletic Trainer of the Year in 1986 and in 1996 the Vikings staff was honored as the NFL Athletic Training Staff of the Year. He was inducted into the Vikings Ring of Honor on December 20, 1998.

Death
Zamberletti died September 2, 2018 of spinal osteomyelitis. He was 86.

References

External links
U of Iowa alumni page
StarTribune 12-23-2011

1932 births
2018 deaths
People from Marion County, Iowa
University of Iowa alumni
Minnesota Vikings personnel
American sports coaches
Athletic trainers
Coaches of American football from Minnesota
 Deaths from osteomyelitis